This is a list of notable individuals and organizations who have voiced their endorsement of Amy Klobuchar's campaign for the Democratic Party's nomination for the 2020 U.S. presidential election.

Federal officials

Vice Presidents

Former
Walter Mondale, former Vice President (1977–1981); former U.S. Senator from Minnesota (1964–1976); former Attorney General of Minnesota (1960–1964); Democratic Party nominee for President in 1984 (later endorsed Joe Biden)

U.S. Senators

Current
 Tina Smith, U.S. Senator from Minnesota since 2018; former Lieutenant Governor of Minnesota (2015–2018) (later endorsed Joe Biden)

Former
 Mark Pryor, U.S Senator from Arkansas (2003–2015); Attorney General of Arkansas (1999–2003) (later endorsed Joe Biden)
 Blanche Lincoln, U.S Senator from Arkansas (1999–2011); U.S. Representative from AR-1 (1993–1999)  (later endorsed Joe Biden)

U.S. Representatives

Current
 Linda Sánchez, U.S. Representative from CA-38 since 2003 (later endorsed Joe Biden)
 Angie Craig, U.S. Representative from MN-02 since 2019 (later endorsed Joe Biden)
 Dean Phillips, U.S. Representative from MN-03 since 2019 (later endorsed Joe Biden)
 Collin Peterson, U.S. Representative from MN-07 since 1991 (later endorsed Joe Biden)
 Betty McCollum, U.S. Representative from MN-04 since 2001 (later endorsed Joe Biden)

Former
Bill Luther, U.S. Representative from MN-06 (1995–2003) (later endorsed Joe Biden)
Lynn Schenk, U.S. Representative from CA-49 (1993–1995) (later endorsed Joe Biden)
 Joe Sestak, U.S. Representative from PA-07 (2007–2011) and former 2020 presidential candidate (later endorsed Joe Biden)
Vic Snyder, U.S. Representative from AR-02 (1997 to 2011)

Sub-Cabinet-level officials

Former
 Roxanne Conlin, former U.S. Attorney for the Southern District of Iowa (1977–1981)

U.S. Ambassadors

Former
 Gordon Giffin, former U.S. Ambassador to Canada (1997–2001)
 Samuel D. Heins, former U.S. Ambassador to Norway (2016–2017)
 Samuel L. Kaplan, former U.S. Ambassador to Morocco (2009–2013)
 James B. Smith, former U.S. Ambassador to Saudi Arabia (2009–2013)

State officials

Governors

Current
 Tim Walz, Governor of Minnesota since 2019; former U.S. Representative from MN-01 (2007–2019) (later endorsed Joe Biden)

Former
 Roy Barnes, former Governor of Georgia (1999–2003) (later endorsed Joe Biden)

Statewide executive officials

Current
 Julie Blaha, Minnesota State Auditor since 2019
 Peggy Flanagan, Lieutenant Governor of Minnesota since 2019 (later endorsed Joe Biden)
 Debora Pignatelli, New Hampshire Executive Councilwoman from District 5 from 2004 to 2010, from 2012 to 2014 and since 2019; former New Hampshire State Senator from District 13 (1992–2002); former New Hampshire State Representative (1986–1992) and former Assistant Minority Leader in the New Hampshire House of Representatives
 Peter Franchot, Comptroller of Maryland since 2007

Former
 Joe Foster, former Attorney General of New Hampshire (2013–2017); former New Hampshire State Senator from District 13 (2002–2008) and New Hampshire State Senate majority leader (2006–2008); former New Hampshire State Representative (1995–1998)
 David Frederickson, former Agriculture Commissioner of Minnesota (2011–2019); former Minnesota State Senator from District 20 (1987–1993)
Skip Humphrey, former Attorney General of Minnesota (1983–1999)

State legislators

Current
 Tippi McCullough, Arkansas State Representative for District 33 since 2019
 Alex Bergstein, Connecticut State Senator from District 36 since 2019
 Liz Mathis, Iowa State Senator from District 34 since 2011
 Todd Taylor, Iowa State Senator for District 35 since 2019; Iowa State Representative for District 50 (1995–2013) and for District 70 (2013–2019)
 Kevin Kinney, Iowa State Senator for District 39 since 2015
 Rich Taylor, Iowa State Senator for District 42 since 2013
 Rob Hogg, Iowa State Senator for District 33 since 2007; former Iowa State Representative from District 38 (2003–2007)
 Chris Hall, Iowa State Representative from District 13 since 2013 and for District 2 (2011–2013) (previously endorsed Beto O'Rourke)
 Charlie McConkey, Iowa State Representative for District 15 since 2015(previously endorsed Cory Booker)
 Ruth Ann Gaines, Iowa State Representative from District 32 since 2011
 Marti Anderson, Iowa State Representative from District 36 since 2013
 Karin Derry, Iowa State Representative from District 38 since 2019
 Ross Wilburn, Iowa State Representative from District 46 since 2019 (previously endorsed Kamala Harris)
 Sharon Steckman, Iowa State Representative for District 53 since 2009
 Andy McKean, Iowa State Representative from District 58 since 2017
 Dave Williams, Iowa State Representative for District 60 since 2019
 Bruce Bearinger, Iowa State Representative for District 63 since 2013 (previously endorsed Steve Bullock)
 Molly Donahue, Iowa State Representative for District 68 since 2019
 Cindy Winckler, Iowa State Representative for District 44 (2001–2003) and for District 86 since 2003
 Monica Kurth, Iowa State Representative from District 89 since 2017 (previously endorsed Cory Booker)
 Michele Meyer, Maine State Representative from District 2
 Tom Bakk, Minnesota State Senator from District 6 (2003–2013) and from District 3 since 2013; Minnesota Senate Minority Leader (2011–2013) and since 2017; former Minnesota Senate Majority Leader (2013–2017); former Minnesota State Representative from District 6A (1995–2003)
 Kent Eken, Minnesota State Senator from District 4 since 2013; former Minnesota State Representative from District 2A (2003–2013)
 Nick Frentz, Minnesota State Senator from District 19 since 2017
 Dan Sparks, Minnesota State Senator from District 27 since 2019
 John Hoffman, Minnesota State Senator from District 36 since 2013
 Jerry Newton, Minnesota State Senator from District 37 since 2017; former Minnesota State Representative from District 49B (2009–2011) and District 37A (2013–2017)
 Jason Isaacson, Minnesota State Senator from District 42 since 2017; former Minnesota State Representative from District 42B (2013–2017)
 Chuck Wiger, Minnesota State Senator from District 55 (1997–2013) and from District 43 since 2013
 Ann Rest, Minnesota State Senator from District 46 (2001–2013) and from District 45 since 2013; former Minnesota State Representative from District 46A (1985–2001)
 Chris Eaton, Minnesota State Senator from District 46 (2011–2013) and from District 40 since 2013
 Ron Latz, Minnesota State Senator from District 44 (2007–2013) and from District 46 since 2013; former Minnesota State Representative from District 44B (2003–2007)
 Steve Cwodzinski, Minnesota State Senator from District 48 since 2017
 Melisa Franzen, Minnesota State Senator from District 49 since 2013
 Melissa Halvorson Wiklund, Minnesota State Senator from District 50 since 2013
 Matt Klein, Minnesota State Senator from District 52 since 2017
 Greg Clausen, Minnesota State Senator from District 53 since 2013
 Susan Kent, Minnesota State Senator from District 53 since 2013
 Karla Bigham, Minnesota State Senator from District 54 since 2018; former Minnesota State Representative from District 57A (2007–2011)
 Matt Little, Minnesota State Senator from District 58 since 2017
 Kari Dziedzic, Minnesota State Senator from District 59 (2012–2013) and from District 60 since 2013
 Patricia Torres Ray, Minnesota State Senator from District 62 (2007–2013) and from District 63 since 2013
 Dick Cohen, Minnesota State Senator from District 64 since 1987; former Minnesota State Representative from District 63B (1977–1979) and from District 64B (1983–1987)
 Sandy Pappas, Minnesota State Senator from District 65 since 1991 and former President of the Minnesota Senate (2013–2017); former Minnesota State Representative from District 65B (1985–1991)
 Foung Hawj, Minnesota State Senator from District 67 since 2013
 Melissa Hortman, Minnesota State Representative for District 47B (2005–2013) and District 36B since 2013 and Speaker of the Minnesota House of Representatives since 2019; former Minority Leader of the Minnesota House of Representatives (2017–2019)
 Ryan Winkler, Minnesota State Representative for District 44B (2007–2013) and for District 46A from 2013 to 2015 and since 2019; Majority Leader of the Minnesota House of Representatives since 2019
 Ben Lien, Minnesota State Representative for District 4A since 2013
 John Persell, Minnesota State Representative for District 4A (2009–2013) and District 5A from 2013 to 2017 and since 2019
 Jennifer Schultz, Minnesota State Representative for District 7A since 2017
 Dan Wolgamott, Minnesota State Representative for District 14B since 2019
 Jeff Brand, Minnesota State Representative for District 19A since 2019
 Jack Considine, Minnesota State Representative for District 19B since 2015
 Duane Sauke, Minnesota State Representative for District 25B since 2017
 Kelly Morrison, Minnesota State Representative for District 33B since 2019
 Zack Stephenson, Minnesota State Representative for District 36A since 2019
 Kristin Bahner, Minnesota State Representative for District 39B since 2019
 Mike Nelson, Minnesota State Representative for District 46A (2003–2013) and District 40A since 2013
 Peter Fischer, Minnesota State Representative for District 43A since 2013
 Connie Bernardy, Minnesota State Representative for District 48B (2001–2003), District 51B (2003–2006), District 41A since 2013
 Kelly Moller, Minnesota State Representative for District 42A since 2019
 Ginny Klevorn, Minnesota State Representative for District 44A since 2019
 Patty Acomb, Minnesota State Representative for District 44B since 2019
 Mike Freiberg, Minnesota State Representative for District 45B since 2013
 Cheryl Youakim, Minnesota State Representative for District 46B since 2015
 Laurie Pryor, Minnesota State Representative for District 48A since 2017
 Heather Edelson, Minnesota State Representative for District 49A since 2019
 Steve Elkins, Minnesota State Representative for District 49B since 2019
 Sandra Masin, Minnesota State Representative for District 38A (2007–2011) and District 51A since 2013
 Laurie Halverson, Minnesota State Representative for District 51B since 2013
 Brad Tabke, Minnesota State Representative for District 55A since 2019
 Alice Mann, Minnesota State Representative for District 56B since 2019
 Robert Bierman, Minnesota State Representative for District 57A since 2019
 John Huot, Minnesota State Representative for District 57B since 2019
 Mohamud Noor, Minnesota State Representative for District 60B since 2019
 Frank Hornstein, Minnesota State Representative for District 60B (2003–2013) and District 61A since 2013
 Michael Pedersen, New Hampshire State Representative from the Hillsborough District 32 (2018–present) (previously endorsed Elizabeth Warren)
 Latha Mangipudi, New Hampshire State Representative from Hillsborough District 35 since 2013 (previously endorsed Cory Booker)
 Linn Opderbecke, New Hampshire State Representative from the Strafford District 15 since 2016 (previously endorsed Cory Booker)
 Dominick J. Ruggerio, President of the Rhode Island Senate since 2017 and Rhode Island State Senator from District 4 since 1984
 Nicholas Mattiello, Speaker of the Rhode Island House of Representatives since 2014; Rhode Island State Representative from District 15 since 2007 (previously endorsed Joe Biden)
 Creigh Deeds, Virginia State Senator since 2001
 Janet Howell, Virginia State Senator since 1992

Former
 David Johnson, former Iowa State Senator from District 1 (2003–2019; Iowa State Representative from District 6 (1997–2003) (independent)
 Roger Stewart, former Iowa State Senator for District 13 (2003–2010)
 Swati Dandekar, former U.S. Executive Director of the Asian Development Bank (2016–2017); former member of the Iowa Utilities Board (2011–2013); former Iowa State Senator from District 18 (2009–2011); former Iowa State Representative from District 36 (2003–2009)
 Patrick J. Deluhery, former Iowa State Senator for District 41 (1979–1983) and Districts 22 and 21 (1983–1993)
 Bill Gannon, former Iowa State Representative for District 66 (1965–1971) and former Iowa House of Representatives Minority Floor Leader (previously endorsed Steve Bullock) 
 Linda Nelson, former Iowa State Representative and former Chair of the Pottawattamie County Democrats
 Patrick Gill, former Iowa State Representative for District 2 (1991–1994)
  (switched endorsement to Pete Buttigieg)
 Marcella Frevert, former Iowa State Representative for District 8 (1997–2003)
 William Witt, former Iowa State Representative for District 23 (1993–2003)
 Darrell Hanson, former Iowa State Representative for District 18 (1973–1983), District 48 (1983–1993) and District 27 (1993–1995) (Republican)
 Steve Falck, former Iowa State Representative for District 28 (1997–2002)
 Kay Halloran, former Iowa State Representative for District 49 (1983–1992) and from District 56 (1997–2001); former Mayor of Cedar Rapids (2006–2009)
 Nancy Dunkel, former Iowa State Representative for District 57 (2013–2017)
 Edgar Bittle, former Iowa State Representative for District 66 (1973–1977) (Republican)
 Sally Stutsman, former Iowa State Representative for District 77 (2013–2017)
 Elaine Lauterborn, former New Hampshire State Representative (2008–2010); Deputy Mayor of Rochester, New Hampshire
 Patricia "Ricia" McMahon, former New Hampshire State Representative from Merrimack District 3 (2004–2010)

Local and municipal officials

Current 
 Melvin Carter, Mayor of Saint Paul, Minnesota since 2018
 Jacob Frey, Mayor of Minneapolis, Minnesota since 2018
 Emily Larson, Mayor of Duluth, Minnesota since 2016

Party officials

Current 
 Norm Sterzenbach, Iowa Caucus Advisor for Klobuchar's campaign since 2019; former Executive Director of the Iowa Democratic Party (2006–2013); former director of Beto O'Rourke's 2020 campaign (2019) (previously endorsed Beto O'Rourke)

Former 
 Andy McGuire, former Chair of the Iowa Democratic Party (2015–2017)

Notable individuals

Academics, experts, and writers
 John Bessler, attorney and academic; Klobuchar's husband
 Jim Klobuchar, journalist, author, columnist, and travel guide; Klobuchar's father

Athletes and sports figures
 Phill Drobnick, curler

Entertainers
 Clay Aiken, singer, former nominee for the North Carolina's 2nd congressional district, and LGBT activist (switched from earlier endorsement of Joe Biden)
 Greg Berlanti, writer, producer and director (also endorsed Pete Buttigieg)
 Lorraine Gary, actress
 Teri Hatcher, actress
 Jay Leno, comedian and talk show host
 Jane Lynch, Actress

Political activists
 Melanie Benjamin, Chief Executive of the Mille Lacs Band of Ojibwe, 2000–2008 and since 2012
Amy Siskind, author and activist
Charlie Vig, Chairman of the Shakopee Mdewakanton Sioux Community since 2012, former Vice Chairman of the Shakopee Mdewakanton Sioux Community (2012)

Organizations

Newspapers
Iowa City Press-Citizen
New Hampshire Union Leader
Quad-City Times
Seacoast Media Group
The New York Times (co-endorsement with Elizabeth Warren)
The Keene Sentinel
Las Vegas Sun and Las Vegas Weekly (co-endorsement with Joe Biden)
The Mercury News and East Bay Times
Houston Chronicle
San Francisco Chronicle
The Seattle Times
Bangor Daily News

References

External links
 *Official website

Amy Klobuchar
Klobuchar, Amy
Klobuchar, Amy